The Japan Energy Griffins were a Japanese basketball team that played in the Japan Basketball League. They were based in Tokyo.

Notable players
Shigeaki Abe
Yoshihiko Amano
Mike Boyd (basketball, born 1972)
Corey Gaines
Alfred Grigsby
Kenichi Imaizumi
Takatoshi Ishibashi
Akira Kodama
Mototaka Kohama
Koju Munakata
Kunihiko Nakamura
Setsuo Nara
Tetsurō Noborisaka
Kenji Okamura
Yasukuni Ōshima
Eric Reveno
Hiroshi Saitō 
Satoshi Sakumoto
Kiyomi Sato
Masashi Shiga
Shūtarō Shōji
Alex Stivrins
Kimikazu Suzuki
Tomohide Utsumi
Howard Wright

Coaches
John Patrick (basketball)

References

Defunct basketball teams in Japan
Sports teams in Tokyo
Basketball teams established in 1937
Basketball teams disestablished in 1998
1937 establishments in Japan
1998 disestablishments in Japan